Henry Clement Byerly (August 7, 1935 – December 28, 2016) was an American philosopher known for his work in philosophy of science, logic and evolutionary theory. He was Professor Emeritus at the University of Arizona, where he taught from 1967–1995.

Education

Henry Byerly attended the University of Minnesota, where he earned an undergraduate degree in mathematics and physics, a master's degree in mathematics, and a PhD in philosophy. His PhD was given for his 1967 thesis "The Ontological Status of Theoretical Entities.". He studied for his doctorate under May Brodbeck, a student of Gustav Bergmann.

Bibliography

Books

Selected Papers

References

2016 deaths
1935 births
20th-century American philosophers
University of Minnesota College of Liberal Arts alumni
University of Arizona faculty
21st-century American philosophers